The Record of Tea, also known as the Tea Note is a Chinese tea classic by Cai Xiang written in 1049–1053 CE.

Reputed as one of the greatest calligraphers of the Song dynasty, Cai Xiang was also a great tea connoisseur. During the Qingli (慶曆) era  of the Renzong Emperor (1041–1048), Cai Xiang was the Officer of Transportation in Fujian. He pioneered the manufacture of a small "Dragon Tribute Tea Cake" (大小龙团 daxiao longtuan) of superlative quality. 

He wrote the first tea treatise of the Song dynasty, The Record of Tea. In this book, he documents, explains in detail, comments and also criticizes the preparation and usage of tea and its vessels. He also made one of the first documented comments on Jian ware. The work consists of two volumes. 

He was a native of Fujian; he was the first writer to report the tea spotting game of Jian'an (now Shuiji county in Fujian).

Table of contents
 Part I: About Tea
 Properties of Tea
 On Storage
 On Baking
 On Pressing
 On Sieving
 On Boiling Water
 On Preheating
 On Tea Spotting
 Part II: Tea Utensils
 Tea Warmer
 Tea Canister
 Tea Hammer
 Tea Clamps
 Tea Grinder
 Tea Sieve
 Tea Vessel
 Tea Spoon
 Tea Kettle

Quotes

See also 
 Treatise on Tea by the Huizong Emperor, written in 1107 CE
 Pictorial of Tea Ware by Shenan, written in 1269 CE

References 

Chinese tea classic texts
Song dynasty literature
1040s books
11th-century Chinese books